François VI de Beauharnais, 2nd marquis de La Ferté-Beauharnais (also 3rd comte des Roches-Baritaud, baron de Beauville, seigneur de Beaumont et de Bellechauve; 12 August 1756, La Rochelle – 3 March 1846, Paris) was a French nobleman. He was the son of François V de Beauharnais, seigneur de Beaumont et de Bellechauve, baron de Beauville, 1st marquis de La Ferté-Beauharnais, and of his wife Marie Anne Henriette Françoise Pyvart de Chastullé. This made him the elder brother of Alexandre de Beauharnais and the uncle of Napoleon's stepchildren Eugène and Hortense.

Life
He represented the nobility of États Généraux of 1789, but later emigrated to join Condé's army as a major general. However, he later rallied to the First French Empire, which sent him on various diplomatic missions. Francis VI of Beauharnais was one of the great-grandfathers of the family Eslandoost de Beauville.

Marriages and issue
On 1 May 1778 François de Beauharnais married Françoise de Beauharnais (La Rochelle, 7 September 1757 – Sézanne, 24 June 1822), daughter of Claude de Beauharnais, 2nd comte des Roches-Baritaud, and wife Marie-Anne-Françoise Mouchard. They divorced in 1793, after having four daughters: 
 Adélaïde de Beauharnais (1779–1852)
 Françoise de Beauharnais (1780–1780)
 Émilie de Beauharnais (1781–1855), court official, married in 1798 comte Antoine Marie Chamans de La Valette (1769–1830), whom she had saved.
 Amédée de Beauharnais (1782–1784)

On 11 October 1802, François de Beauharnais married Louise von Cohausen (1775–1822), daughter of Karl Caspar Hubertus, reichsritter von Cohausen, and of Elisabeth Umbscheiden von Ehrencron. They had two daughters: 
 Hortense de Beauharnais (1812–1851), married in 1840 comte Richard de Querelles (1808–1846). On his death, she married in 1848 senator Armand Laity (1812–1899)
 Augusta de Beauharnais (1813–1831)

1756 births
1846 deaths
Beauharnais